Blackstone River is a medium-sized river originating in the front ranges of the Canadian Rockies.  It is a tributary of the Brazeau River, which in turn flows into the North Saskatchewan River.

The Blackstone forms at the base of a geological feature known as the Tarpeian Rock, just outside the southern boundary of Jasper National Park.

History 
Members of the Palliser Expedition discovered this river in the late 1850s. It was named the South Brazeau River after one of the expedition members, Joseph Brazeau of St. Louis.

Later, the river was renamed the Blackstone.

Tributaries
(from headwaters to the Brazeau River)
Mons Creek
George Creek
Smith Creek
Cutoff Creek
Wapiabi Creek
Shanks Creek
Lookout Creek
Hansen Creek
Chungo Creek
Dorothy Creek, Seepage Creek, Brown Creek, Clark Creek, McCormick Creek, Ashburner Creek
Rundell Creek

See also
List of Alberta rivers

Rivers of Alberta